The James G. Eddy House and Grounds is a historic property in Medina, Washington. The two-story mansion was built in 1925 for James Garfield Eddy. It has been listed on the National Register of Historic Places since February 19, 1982. THE COLONIAL Revival home hugging the bluff is half hidden from Lake Washington by a landscape that has been developing for nearly 90 years. When James Garfield Eddy and his family moved into their Medina house in 1918, the Great War had just ended and Seattle, along with the rest of the country, was trying to get back to normal. Twenty-two years before the first bridge crossed Lake Washington, Eddy commuted to Seattle by boat from his Lake Washington dock to the foot of Madison Street and then by streetcar into town. But it was worth the commute.

His five-acre estate, formerly apple orchards, was shaped into gardens framed by evergreens. It was an appropriate setting for a man whose family had gained from the sale of timber and sought to preserve that richness for future generations through tree breeding.

As was the case with several of Seattle's pioneering lumbermen, the Eddy family had left Maine for Michigan for the Pacific Northwest as the great East Coast and Midwest forests were depleted to build American towns and cities. In 1903, James and his brother John partnered with David Skinner to purchase the Port Blakely Mill Co. on Bainbridge Island. James realized that in order to benefit from trees, you needed to replenish them. He became one of the first tree breeders in the country.

In 1918, he consulted with Luther Burbank about producing better forest trees through breeding experiments and joined him at his California nursery to explore the potential. These early experiments led to the establishment, in 1925, of a research station in Placerville, Calif., that, by 1931, had become the most complete arboretum of pines in the world. Eddy funded the station until it was turned over to the U.S. Forest Service in 1935.

Eddy's home recalled the New England traditional architecture that was part of his family's geographic roots. Built by Howard S. Wright Sr., the 10-bedroom house wraps around the driveway in an unpretentious manner that downplays its size. The modest entrance is framed with nonsymmetrical wings that bend slightly (coincidentally creating some quirky angular bathrooms and storage areas inside). Its interiors, while spacious and well-proportioned, are also understated, with low ceilings throughout. There is no fancy woodwork or decorative molding, only first-growth fir paneling in the stair hall and quarter-sawn oak floors. This and the 8-foot ceiling heights reinforce the early New England Colonial ambiance.

Yet the house is designed for entertaining and also for maximum light and ventilation. Its principal rooms are oriented toward Lake Washington and are spacious, despite those low ceilings. French doors open on hinges to connect living and dining room to outdoor living areas. Two large skylit bays, one in the informal kitchen/dining area, one in the den/family room on the other side of the house, turn these rooms into solaria. Previous owners opened up the original kitchen with rough-cut timber and beams but complementary fir cabinetry.

Otto Holmdahl laid out the grounds and pathways. At the time, he was one of only a few landscape designers practicing in the Puget Sound area. His interest in native plant materials and regional landscape made the landscape designer and his client the perfect match. He also took pleasure in forming concrete aggregate into steps and walkways — a style he repeated in his work at Woodland Park and the Loveless Studio Building courtyard later in his career.

References

National Register of Historic Places in King County, Washington
Houses completed in 1925
1925 establishments in Washington (state)